The Hungarian Cricket Association is the governing body of the sport of cricket in Hungary.  It was founded in October 2006. Its headquarters are located in Budapest. The National Cricket Ground is the GB Oval in Sződliget, just north of Budapest.

The Hungarian Cricket Association represents Hungary in the International Cricket Council, of which it is one of the newest Affiliate members, having been accepted into membership in 2012. In 2017, became an associate member

Hungarian Cricket League

Cup competitions

Clubs

National team highlights
First matches played in Slovenia in September 2007. First official match played in Prague against Bulgaria in August 2008.

Hungary won the European Twenty20 Championship of 2010, held in Skopje, Macedonia, beating Russia in the final. They defended the title in August 2011 at their home ground, Szödliget, just north of Budapest, with victory over Bulgaria in the final.

In the 2014 season, Habib Deldar was the captain of the Hungarian national cricket team, and Abhijeet Marc Ahuja was vice-captain.

Women's cricket
Female cricketers have been involved in Hungarian cricket since its introduction in Comenius School in Székesfehérvár in September 2006, as players, coaches, umpires and scorers. A women's national team has represented Hungary at home and abroad since February 2008 (Potsdam, Germany).

Hungary hosted international women's tournaments in 2009 and 2010. The women's national team came second in a 4-nation tournament in Belgium in 2011, losing to Germany in the final.

Junior cricket
Introducing and coaching cricket in schools has taken place non-stop since September 2006 and there are regular introduction to cricket workshops and demonstrations.

Juniors have played in the Hungarian Cricket League since its inception in 2007 and have travelled around Europe representing Hungary since June 2007. One highlight was victory in a tournament in Croatia in 2010. National championships have been held indoors and outdoors since February 2010.

Native cricket
Hungary will host a European international native tournament on June 28–30, 2019 against Poland, Serbia and Estonia.

HCA Board
Nov 2006 - Dec 2008: Andrew Leckonby (BB), Andy Grieve, Chairman (Com), David Brown (DCC)

Dec 2008 - Sept 2009: Ferenc Zsigri, President (DK), Gabor Torok (DK), Mike Glover (BBA)

Sept 2009 - Feb 2011: Andrew Leckonby (BBA, Benjamin Lebor (Pho), David Brown (DCC), Gabor Torok, President (DK), Mike Glover (BBA)

Feb 2011 - Feb 2013: Adrian Zador (DCC), Andrew Leckonby (BBA), Benjamin Lebor (Pho), Gabor Torok, President (DK), Mike Glover (BBA)

Feb 2013 - Feb 2015: Adrian Zador (DCC), Andras Toth, Andrew Leckonby (BBA), Khaibar Deldar (BF), Marton Kis, President

2016 - 2018: Duncan Shoebridge, Marton Kis, Steve Anthony, Adrian Zador

Notes

External links
Hungarian Cricket Association, official web site (in English)

Cricket administration
Cricket